St. Thomas Aquinas Catholic Secondary School is a Catholic secondary school located in the southern part of Lindsay, Ontario. It is currently the only Catholic secondary school in the City of Kawartha Lakes. The school was opened in 2000, and celebrated its 10th anniversary on March 29, 2011.

There are approximately 300 students enrolled in grades 9 through 12, making it the smallest of three High Schools located in Lindsay. Students are required to wear a uniform purchased from R.J. McCarthy in navy blue, white, gold, and khaki pieces specific to St. Thomas Aquinas Catholic Secondary School. The school offers classes for the workplace, college and university-bound student, as well as a Specialist High Skills Majors (SHSM) in Health/Wellness and their brand new Agriculture Specialist High Skills Major program, introduced in 2019. A French immersion program was introduced in 2016. Advanced Placement courses are also offered. K courses are also offered at the school for students who are not achieving credits but are working towards building basic life skills, social skills and skills to prepare them for entry-level jobs in the workplace.

Extracurricular activities 
St. Thomas Aquinas has various extracurricular activities ranging in arts, intellectual, spiritual, and leadership associated activities. They include the following:
Yearbook
Choir
Jazz/Concert Band
Drama Club 
Art Club 
Student Administrative Council 
Link Club 
House Council
Strategy Club
Pro-Life Club 
Social Justice Club 
Green Team 
Spirit Team
Math Club
 Winter Runners Club
Tech Crew

Sports  
St. Thomas Aquinas offers a variety of male and female sports, including

Cross Country Running
Basketball 
Volleyball / Beach Volleyball 
Hockey 
Baseball 
Track and Field 
Swimming 
Field Hockey
Rugby 7s/15s
Soccer
Badminton
Intramurals

St. Thomas Aquinas SHSM partnerships 
St. Thomas Aquinas has professional and community partnerships for SHSM students:

Health and wellness (STAT)
Trent University
Durham College
Fleming College
Ross Memorial Hospital
Caressant Care
Frost Manor
Community Care
Ontario Early Years

Ontario Youth Apprenticeship Program (OYAP) 

The Ontario Youth Apprenticeship Program consists of a unique combination of Community College Trades Training and a Secondary School Cooperative Education Program. Students are registered as apprentices with the Ministry of Training, Colleges and Universities (MTCU) and attend the college one to three days per week. By the end of the semester, they can earn their Basic - Level One Trade Qualifications in that program. The student remains an OYAP Apprentice until the end of the semester. Fees associated with the registration and College textbooks are covered by the OYAP Board Budget. These programs are considered “Dual Credit Programs” since the students receive both Secondary School and College credits during the semester. St. Thomas Aquinas' OYAP program is partnered with Durham College, Fleming College, and Loyalist College.

Feeder schools 
Pope John Paul II Catholic Elementary School, Lindsay
St. Dominic Catholic Elementary School, Lindsay
St. Luke Catholic Elementary School, Downeyville
St. Mary Catholic Elementary School, Lindsay

See also
List of high schools in Ontario

References

External links
 St. Thomas Aquinas Catholic Secondary School Official Website
 STACSS Wikispace
 Peterborough Victoria Northumberland and Clarington Catholic District School Board

High schools in Kawartha Lakes
Catholic secondary schools in Ontario
Educational institutions established in 2000
2000 establishments in Ontario